USCGC Cape Cross was a  type "C"  constructed at the Coast Guard Yard at Curtis Bay, Maryland in 1958 for use as a law enforcement and search and rescue patrol boat.

Design
The Cape-class cutter was designed originally for use as a shallow-draft anti-submarine warfare (ASW) craft and was needed because of the increased tension brought about by the Cold War. Cape Cross was a type "C" Cape-class cutter and was never fitted with ASW gear because the Coast Guard's mission emphasis had shifted away from ASW to search and rescue by the time she was built. The hull was constructed of steel and the superstructure was aluminum. She was powered originally by four Cummins VT-600 diesel engines; however during 1980–1982 she was refit with two 16V149 Detroit Diesel main engines.

History
The  Cape class was originally developed as an ASW boat and as a replacement for the aging, World War II vintage, wooden  patrol boats that were used mostly for search and rescue duties. With the outbreak of the Korean War and the requirement tasked to the Coast Guard to secure and patrol port facilities in the United States under the Magnuson Act of 1950, the complete replacement of the 83-foot boat was deferred and the 95-foot boat was used for harbor patrols. The first 95-foot hulls were laid down at the Coast Guard Yard in 1952 and were officially described as "seagoing patrol cutters". The class was named for North American geographic capes.

The Cape class was replaced by the   beginning in the late 1980s and many of the decommissioned cutters were transferred to nations of the Caribbean and South America by the Coast Guard.

Cape Cross was homeported at New Castle, New Hampshire from 1959 to 1968 where she was used for law enforcement and search and rescue (SAR). In June 1965, she assisted in the unsuccessful search of a ditched U.S. Air Force C-121 aircraft east of Nantucket, Massachusetts. On 28 May 1967, she medevaced a crewman from the fishing vessel Phillip J. Two Polish motor vessels were escorted from U.S. waters on 11 June.

In 1969, her homeport was transferred to Gloucester, Massachusetts where she was used for law enforcement and SAR missions. On 10 January 1977, two crewmen from the fishing vessel Chester A. Poling off Cape Ann, Massachusetts.

In 1982, Cape Cross underwent a major renovation which included removing the four Cummins main drive engines and replacing them with two Detroit Diesel units. After this modification, she was stationed at Crescent City, California for law enforcement and SAR. After 15 April 1987, she was homeported at Hilo, Hawaii.

Disposition
After decommissioning in 1990, Cape Cross was transferred to the Federated States of Micronesia and recommissioned as Paluwlap (FSM 03).

Notes
Citations

References used

 
 
 
 
 
 

1958 ships
Cross
Ships built by the United States Coast Guard Yard